is a 1961 Japanese epic tokusatsu science fiction disaster film directed by Shūe Matsubayashi. Produced and distributed by Toho, it was Toho's second highest-grossing film in Japan that year.

Plot 
The film begins with a narration over shots of a modern-day Tokyo, noting that 16 years have passed since the end of World War II, and Japan has achieved rapid recovery. Mokichi Tamura works as a driver for a press center, hoping for happiness for his family. His daughter, Saeko, is in love with a merchant, Takano, who has been at sea for a long time. When he returns, the young couple agrees to get married with the consent of Saeko's father.

Meanwhile, tensions between the Federation and the Alliance (fictional stand-ins for the United States/NATO and the USSR/Warsaw Pact, respectively) build, especially after an intelligence-gathering vessel is captured. A new Korean War breaks out across the 38th parallel, with the Federation and Alliance drawn into the war. Tensions reach a critical level; dogfights between Federation and Alliance fighters over the Arctic Ocean (with both sides using nuclear-tipped air-to-air missiles) are just the beginning of a renewed conflict. Two Federation and Alliance ICBMs are nearly launched, though both are halted. Although Japan calls on both sides to seek peace, government officials think that the country could be ripe for Alliance retaliation in light of its open support for the Federation. Soon after an armistice agreement is concluded between North Korea and South Korea, tensions erupt again because of the fighting between the two nations. The efforts of the military to overcome the new war are fruitless.

Five ICBMs are eventually launched from both sides, with targets being major cities around the world including Tokyo, London, Paris, New York and Moscow. The Tamura family stays behind amid the city's panic and holds a final dinner. That night, Tokyo is struck by the first of the five ICBMs and blown to pieces. The ground itself is torn open by the blast, enveloping much of the city's wreckage in molten lava. Tamura and his family are killed by the detonation over Tokyo as their house is blown away by the ensuing fireball. Shortly after Tokyo is destroyed, the remaining four missiles impact their targets, obliterating each of them. The following morning, Takano and his crew change the course of their ship to travel towards Tokyo's ruins, prepared to die from exposure to the intense radioactive fallout. The ship's chaperone and Takano break down as the enduring events of what has happened become realized. The last shot shows Tokyo, now an immense crater, with the remains of the Diet Building at the center and a warning laid over the screen, asking for the events in this film never to happen.

Cast 
Frankie Sakai as Mokichi Tamura, Tokyo Press Club limousine driver
Akira Takarada as Takano, sailor on the Kasagi Maru
Yuriko Hoshi as Saeko Tamura, Mokichi's daughter
Nobuko Otowa as Oyoshi Tamura, Mokichi's wife
Yumi Shirakawa as Sanae, Ebara's daughter
Chishu Ryu as Ebara, cook on the Kasagi-Maru
Jerry Ito as Watkins, reporter
Eijiro Tono as Umehara, Captain of the Kasagi-Maru
So Yamamura as Masaki, Prime Minister of Japan
Ken Uehara as Minister of Foreign Affairs
Seizaburo Kawazu as Suitani, Minister of Defense 
Nobuo Nakamura as Fujikawa, Chief Cabinet Secretary 
Chieko Nakakita as Oharu
Shigeki Ishida as Arimura
Naoko Sakabe as Suzue, Oharu's daughter
Kozo Nomura as Ishizaki
Masao Oda as Mr. Mochiya
Teruko Mita as Izawa, teacher at daycare
Wataru Omae as Kasagi-Maru officer
Koji Abe as Ichiro Tamura, Mochiki's son
Yuko Tominaga as Haru Tamura, Mochiki's daughter
Harold Conway as Federal Army Missile Base Commander
Howard Larson as Federal Army Staff Officer
Leonard Stanford as Federal Army Staff Officer
Ed Keene as Allied Army Commander
Bernard Barre as Allied Army Maintenance Officer
Hank Brown as Federal Army First Lieutenant Mark
Hans Horneff as Allied Army Missile Base Commander
Osman Yusuf as Allied Army Correspondent
Enver Altenbay as Allied Army reconnaissance crew (uncredited)
Rolf Jayser as Allied Army officer (uncredited)
Cump Cubens as Allied Army engineer (uncredited)
Haruo Nakajima as Policeman guiding evacuation (uncredited)

Production
The film had been a goal of Toho producer Tomoyuki Tanaka's for some time, using a script by screenwriter Shinobu Hashimoto, featuring the Cold War escalating to World War III from the perspective of an every-man and his family.  As work progressed, it was discovered that Toei had produced a similar film, World War III Breaks Out: 41 Hours of Fear (1959) (第三次世界大戦 四十一時間の恐怖, Dai-sanji sekai taisen: Yonju-ichi jikan no kyofu), dealing with identical subject matter.  The two companies created their films as a form of competition, with Toho selecting Shue Matsubayashi as director of their film.

City destruction scenes were created using a variety of techniques.  Nuclear attacks on Tokyo, New York, Paris, Moscow and London were done by blowing compressed air upwards at an upside-down miniature.  These scenes were reused in films such as Prophecies of Nostradamus. Miniature structures such as the Kremlin and Tower Bridge were made of wafers.  Tokyo's destruction sequence used molten iron and flammable charcoal to represent the lava flows and burning wreckage.

Release
The Last War was released in Japan on October 8, 1961, where it was distributed by Toho.
The film was Toho's second highest-grossing film of 1961 and the ninth highest grossing Japanese film in 1961.  The film earned ¥284.9 million domestically.

The English version/dubbing of The Last War has only been released on VHS and is currently the only home video release of the film in the United States. Germany has seen a DVD release in 2008, under the title of Todesstrahlen aus dem Weltraum (translation: Death Rays from Outer Space).

References

Footnotes

Sources

External links

 
The Last War online, Japanese language with English subtitles.

1961 films
1960s science fiction films
Anti-war films
Films about nuclear war and weapons
Films directed by Shūe Matsubayashi
Films set in Tokyo
1960s Japanese-language films
Science fiction war films
Toho tokusatsu films
Films produced by Sanezumi Fujimoto
1960s political films
1961 war films
Tokusatsu films
Films about World War III
1960s Japanese films